Baqerabad Rural District is a rural district (dehestan) in the Central District of Mahallat County, Markazi Province, Iran. At the 2006 census, its population was 5,118, in 1,481 families. The rural district has 48 villages.

References 

Rural Districts of Markazi Province
Mahallat County